Carl-Magnus Dellow (born Andersson; 25 October 1951 in Valleberga, Sweden) is a Swedish actor. He is married to the opera singer Eva Österberg.

Dellow was a member of the theatre-society Proteus where he learnt about acting. After studying at Swedish National Academy of Mime and Acting 1974–77 he worked at Norrbottensteatern. He has also been engaged at Folkteatern i Gävleborg, the Royal Dramatic Theatre (1988–present) and Turteatern.

Selected filmography
1987 – Mälarpirater
1991 – Tre kärlekar (TV)
1993 – Sune's Summer
1993 – Mannen på balkongen
1993 – Kådisbellan
1994 – Jönssonligans största kupp
1997 – Reine & Mimmi i fjällen!
1997 – Emma åklagare (TV)
1997 – Rederiet (TV)
1998 – Pistvakt – En vintersaga (TV)
2001 – Hamilton (TV)
2005 – Pistvakt
2006 – LasseMajas detektivbyrå (TV series)

References

External links
Carl-Magnus Dellow on the Royal Dramatic Theatre's website
Carl-Magnus Dellow on Swedish Film Database

Swedish male actors
1951 births
Living people